Simopoulo is a village and a community in the municipal unit of Pineia, Elis, Greece. Since the 2011 local government reform it is part of the municipality Ilida. Simopoulo was the seat of the former municipality Pineia. It is situated in the sparsely populated hills of northern Elis. It is 5 km east of Efyra, 7 km west of Agia Triada and 23 km northeast of Pyrgos. In 2011, the population of the village was 369, and the population of the community, which includes the village Agios Nikolaos, was 390.

Population

References

External links
GTP Simopoulo

Populated places in Elis